The only State disciplined forces in Kiribati are a unified national police force, with prison and quarantine powers, and the coast guard. Defense assistance is provided by Australia and New Zealand. The police force does not report to any ministers but rather directly to the President of Kiribati.

Organization
The Kiribati Police Service is an independent body with one police officer for every 222 people (total staff over 500 with strength approximately 458 sworn members). Ioeru Tokantetaake is the current Commissioner of Police (since 2004), and also presides over prisons in Kiribati.

Arms
The Kiribati Police Service carry few weapons. Drill purpose rifles are used for drills, and some officers have been provided with AR-15 rifles.

Ranks

 Constable
 Senior Constable/Corporal
 Sergeant
 Inspector
 Assistant Superintendent
 Superintendent
 Deputy Commissioner
 Commissioner

Stations

There are police stations on every inhabited island in Kiribati. Key police posts include:

 Betio - also as headquarters for the police force 
 London
 Bairiki- covers the area from Ambo village to Bairiki Village
 Bikenibeu - covers the area from Taborio village to Causeway village
 Bonriki - covers the area of Temwaiku and Bonriki village

Maritime Police

The police operate the RKS Teanoai (301), a Pacific class patrol boat provided to Kiribati by Australia as part of the Pacific Patrol Boat Program and delivered new in 1994. The vessel is registered and stationed in Tarawa.

Prisons

KPS is responsible for managing the prisons in Kiribati. There are 4 prisons in Kiribati with 3 for men and 1 for women. As of 2013, there are 141 persons detained in the system. Prison staff are members of the Kiribati Police Service.

There are two prisons in Kiribati:

 Walter Betio Prison in Betio
 Ronton (London) Prison on Kiritimati Island

Emergency Services

Fire and rescue services are the responsibility of the KPS.

In 2012 Japan donated a chemical pumper to Kiribati to be stationed in Betio to replace the role of the fire truck at Bonriki International Airport on the other end of the island.

Guard of Honour

Select members of the KPS are selected to protect the President and other dignitaries.

References

External links 
http://police.gov.ki/
https://www.webcitation.org/60qHzT2ws?url=http://www.transparency.org.au/documents/kiribati.pdf
https://web.archive.org/web/20070917061747/http://www.csa.nsw.gov.au/AJCSD.staff.Kiribati.htm
http://www.peacegallery.org/asiapacific/kiribati/kiribati06.htm
http://www.isiservicescorp.com/mjcpatch.html

 
Law of Kiribati